Caught Off Guard is the first official album by Much the Same.  At the time, the band was called Don't Look Down.  This EP is now out of print and only available at DownloadPunk.com with a bonus track from the same recording session.

Track listing
 "Moto" – 2:24
 "Here I Am" – 2:27
 "Liar" – 3:03
 "Crying Wolf" – 3:36
 "Someday Not Soon" – 2:14
 "Here All Along" – 2:55
 "Cop Out" (Bonus Track) – 2:35

Personnel 
 Gunner McGrath - lead vocals, guitar
 Mook Snoreck - drums
 Adam Mufich - Bass, vocals
 Andy Simon - guitar, vocals
 Fergus Daly - engineer

2001 albums
Much the Same albums